Dashu Township is a township under the administration of Duchang County, Jiangxi, China. , it has two residential communities and 12 villages under its administration.

References 

Township-level divisions of Jiangxi
Duchang County